Babylon is the fifth studio album released by the hard rock band Ten.

Track listing
All songs written by Gary Hughes.

 "The Stranger" – 7:20
 "Barricade" – 5:22
 "Give In This Time" – 5:24
 "Love Became The Law" – 4:41
 "The Heat" – 5:41
 "Silent Rain" – 6:27
 "Timeless" – 4:54
 "Black Hearted Woman" – 5:35
 "Thunder In Heaven" – 6:58
 "Valentine" – 6:14

2016 Japanese SHM-CD remaster (AVALON MICP-11298) track list:

 "The Stranger"
 "Barricade"
 "Give In This Time"
 "Dawn Star" (bonus track) - 6:07
 "Love Became The Law"
 "The Heat"
 "Silent Rain"
 "Timeless"
 "Black Hearted Woman"
 "Thunder In Heaven"
 "Valentine"

Personnel
Gary Hughes – vocals 
Vinny Burns – Lead guitars
John Halliwell – Rhythm guitars
Steve McKenna – bass guitar
Greg Morgan – drums
Don Airey – keyboards
Gavin Fernie – the voice of Meridian
Georgina Rudden – the voice at Cryotech and Lex's computer

Production
Mixing – Audu Obaje
Engineers – Audu Obaje, Neil Amison, Kirk Podmore, Vinny Burns and Gary Hughes

Chart positions

Album

References

External links
Heavy Harmonies page
melodicrock.com review

Ten (band) albums
2000 albums
Albums produced by Gary Hughes
Frontiers Records albums